The president of the Polish Scouting and Guiding Association (Polish: Przewodniczący Związku Harcerstwa Polskiego, Przewodniczący ZHP) is the highest function in the Polish Scouting and Guiding Association (ZHP). Wiceprzewodniczący/wiceprzewodnicząca ZHP (Vice-President) is his substitute.

Przewodniczący ZHP before the Second World War
 Tadeusz Strumiłło Ph.D. (June 11, 1919 - July 3, 1920);
 Lieutenant General Józef Haller (July 3, 1920 - February 10, 1923);
 Tadeusz Strumiłło Ph.D. - Vice-President;
 priest Jan Mauersberger - Vice-President;
 priest Jan Mauersberger (April 7, 1923 - November 10, 1923;
  Tadeusz Strumiłło Ph.D. (November 10, 1923 - April 18, 1925);
 Maria Wocalewska - Vice-President;
 Roman Bniński (April 18, 1925 - April 12, 1926);
 Maria Wocalewska - Vice-President;
 Józef Karśnicki (April 12, 1926 - April 24, 1927);
 priest hm. RP Jan Mauersberger (April 24, 1927 - December 29, 1929);
 Władysław Sołtan (December 29, 1929 - February 2, 1931);
 Michał Grażyński Ph.D. (February 2, 1931 - September 1, 1939);
 priest hm. RP Jan Mauersberger - Vice-President;
 Wanda Opęchowska - Vice-President;
 hm. RP Helena Grażyńska (1934-1935 ?) - Vice-President;
 Brigadier General Józef Zając (May 21, 1939 – September 1, 1939) - Vice-President.

Przewodniczący ZHP during the Second World War (Szare Szeregi)
 priest hm. RP Jan Mauersberger (September 27, 1939 - August 1942) - Acting President;
 Wanda Opęchowska - Vice-President;
 Tadeusz Kupczyński (August 1942 - December 1944) - Acting President;
 Wanda Opęchowska - Vice-President.

Przewodniczący ZHP outside of Poland since 1945
 Michał Grażyński Ph.D. (February 3, 1946 - November 5, 1960);
 hm. Zygmunt Szadkowski (1960–1967);
 hm. Ryszard Kaczorowski (1967–1988);
 hm. Jan Stanisław Prokop (1967–1968) - Vice-President;
 hm. Zdzisław Kołodziejski - Vice-President;
 hm. Stanisław Berkieta (1988–1994);
 hm. Bogdan Szwagrzak (1994–2000);
 hm. Barbara Zdanowicz (2004 - December 8, 2006);
 hm. Edmund Kasprzyk (December 10, 2006 - December 5, 2009);
 hm. Teresa Ciecierska (December 6, 2009 - November 21, 2015);
hm. Edmund Kasprzyk (December 6, 2009 - January 25, 2011) - Vice President;
hm. Robert Rospedzihowski (November 22, 2015 – Present)
hm. Marek Szablewski (February 2, 2019 – Present) - Vice President

Przewodniczący ZHP after the Second World War

Przewodniczący ZHP 1944-1950
 hm. Stanisław Nowakowski (December 1944 - February 1945);
 hm. Janusz Wierusz-Kowalski (February 1945 - 1947);-
 Józef Sosnowski (1947–1949);
 Jerzy Berek (1949–1950).

Przewodniczący of the ZHP National Council
 hm. Aleksander Kamiński Ph.D. (December 1956 - 1958).

Przewodniczący ZHP since 1990
 hm. Stefan Mirowski (December 1990 - July 13, 1996);
 hm. Anna Zawadzka (1990–1993) - Vice-President;
 hm. Jarosław Balon - Vice-President;
 hm. Wojciech Katner - Vice-President;
 hm. Maria Łyczko - Vice-President;
 prof. hm. Maria Hrabowska - (1996–2001);
 hm. Krzysztof Pater (1997–2001) - Vice-President;
 prof. hm. Wojciech Katner (2001 - December 2, 2005);
 hm. Jacek Smura (2001 - December 2, 2005) - Vice-President;
 hm. Wanda Czarnota (2001 - December 2, 2005) - Vice-President;
 hm. Andrzej Borodzik (December 3, 2005 - September 9, 2007);
 hm. Mariusz Jachta (December 3, 2005 - September 9, 2007) - Vice-President;
 hm. Anna Kirkiewicz (December 3, 2005 - September 9, 2007) - Vice-President;
 hm. Rafał Klepacz (December 3, 2005 - September 9, 2007) - Vice-President;
 prof. hm. Adam Massalski (September 9, 2007 - December 4, 2009);
 hm. Anna Kirkiewicz (September 9, 2007 - December 4, 2009) - Vice-President;
 hm. Andrzej Starski (September 9, 2007 - December 4, 2009) - Vice-President;
 hm. Maciej Szafrański (September 9, 2007 - December 4, 2009) - Vice-President;
 prof. hm. Adam Massalski (December 5, 2009 - );
 hm. Rafał M. Socha (December 5, 2009 - ) - Vice-President;
 hm. Dariusz Supeł (December 5, 2009 - ) - Vice-President.

Scouting and Guiding in Poland
Poland